Young S. Cho (born 1 January 1934), also known as Jo Yeong-seok, is a South Korean alpine skier. He competed in two events at the 1964 Winter Olympics.

He attended Waseda University in Tokyo, Japan. He participated in the university division of the 42nd (1961), 43rd (1962), and 44th (1963) Winter Korean National Sports Festivals along with a team of fellow Koreans living in Japan.

He moved to the United States in 1966, where he established a textile manufacturing business. By 1975 he had become the president of the Colorado Korean Association. He is also a member of the Rotary Club of Denver. He is a board member of the Colorado Symphony Orchestra. In 2021 and 2022, he organized golf tournaments to provide scholarships to children of employees at Pinehurst Country Club, where he had been a member for five decades.

References

External links
 

1934 births
Living people
South Korean male alpine skiers
Olympic alpine skiers of South Korea
Alpine skiers at the 1964 Winter Olympics
Waseda University alumni
Sportspeople from North Gyeongsang Province
20th-century South Korean people